Takumi Fujiwara (born 25 February 1962) is a sailor from Japan, who represented his country at the 1984 Summer Olympics in Los Angeles, United States as crew member in the Soling. With helmsman Takaharu Hirozawa and fellow crew member Minoru Okita they took the 16th place.

References

Living people
1962 births
Sailors at the 1984 Summer Olympics – Soling
Olympic sailors of Japan
Japanese male sailors (sport)